Pinophilini is a tribe of rove beetles in the family Staphylinidae.

Genera
These genera belong to the tribe Pinophilini:
 Lathropinus Sharp, 1866 g b
 Mimopinophilus Coiffait, 1978 g
 Oedichirus Erichson, 1839 c g
 Palaminus Erichson, 1839 c g b
 Pinophilus Gravenhorst, 1802 c g b
 Procirrus Latreille, 1829 c g
†Cretoprocirrus Shaw et al., 2020 Burmese amber, Myanmar, Cenomanian
Data sources: i = ITIS, c = Catalogue of Life, g = GBIF, b = Bugguide.net

References

Further reading

External links 

 

Paederinae